The Charles Brownlow Trophy, better known as the Brownlow Medal (and informally as "Charlie"), is awarded to the "best and fairest" player in the Australian Football League (AFL) during the home-and-away season, as determined by votes cast by the three officiating field umpires after each game. It is the most prestigious award for individual players in the AFL. It is also widely acknowledged as the highest individual honour in the sport of Australian rules football.

The medal was first awarded by the Victorian Football League (VFL). It was created and named in honour of Charles Brownlow, a former Geelong Football Club footballer (1880–1891) and club secretary (1885–1923), and VFL president (1918–19), who had died in January 1924 after an extended illness.

"Fairest and best"

Although the award is generally spoken of the "best and fairest", the award's specific criterion is "fairest and best", reflecting an emphasis on sportsmanship and fair play (this also explains the decision to have the votes cast by the umpires), as the 1924 illuminated facsimile expressly states:

The VFL was the last of the three elite leagues to strike an award for league best and fairest, with the SANFL's Magarey Medal being first awarded in 1898, and the WAFL's Sandover Medal first being awarded since 1921. Over time, all three awards have migrated towards similar rules regarding voting and eligibility. 

But for the change of the monogram from VFL to AFL in 1990, the design, shape and size of the medallion itself has remained virtually unchanged from that of 1924.

Criteria for "fairest" and "best"

Voting procedure for "best"
To determine the best player, the three field umpires (not the goal umpires or boundary umpires) confer after each home-and-away match and award 3 votes, 2 votes and 1 vote to the players they regard as the best, second best and third best in the match respectively. On the awards night, the votes from each match are tallied, and the player or players with the highest number of votes is awarded the medal (subject to eligibility – see below).

The current voting system has been used for the vast majority of Brownlow Medal counts. There have been different voting systems for short periods in the past:
 until 1930, only one vote was cast in each game. This was changed to the current 3–2–1 system after the 1930 season saw three players tied on four votes apiece;
 in 1929, voting was suspended during rounds when the state team was active to avoid disadvantaging the players selected in the team, but this provision was not retained beyond 1929.
 in 1976, the VFL introduced a second field umpire, and both umpires individually awarded 3–2–1 votes; this voting system was abandoned in 1978, and the two (and later, three) umpires conferred to give a single set of 3–2–1 votes.

Since the rules were changed after the 1980 season, if two or more eligible players score the equal highest number of votes, each wins a Brownlow medal. Up to 1980, if two or more players were tied, a single winner was chosen on a countback:
 under the initial rules until 1930, the umpiring panel would be called to meet and agree upon a winner among the tied players
 added to the rules at some stage prior to 1930 (but without removing the previous stipulation – causing confusion in the tied 1930 count), the winner was the player who had the highest percentage of votes polled vs games played;
 after 1930, the winner was the player who had the most 3-vote games; then, if still tied, the most 2-vote games.

Even with these considerations, these countbacks failed to separate Des Fothergill and Herbie Matthews, who tied for the medal in 1940. The league decided to keep the original medal and award replica medals to the two winners. In 1989, the eight players who since the inception of the award had tied on votes but lost on a countback were awarded retrospective medals.

Ineligibility
The fairest component of the medal is achieved by making ineligible any player who is suspended by the AFL Tribunal during the home-and-away season. An ineligible player cannot win the Brownlow Medal, regardless of the number of votes he has received.

A player remains eligible for the Brownlow Medal under the following circumstances:
 if he is suspended during the finals or pre-season;
 if he serves a suspension in the current season which was earned for an offence committed late in the previous season;
 he receives any sort of club-imposed suspension which is not recognised by the AFL Tribunal;
 if he is found guilty by the AFL Tribunal of an offence which attracts only a financial penalty.

The application of the ineligibility criteria has remained fairly consistent throughout the history of the award, with some subtle changes, since it was introduced in 1931. The main exception was from 2005 until 2014, when a player would become ineligible if he committed an infringement that the Tribunal's Match Review Panel judged as being worthy of a one-game suspension, before applying adjustments based on a player's good or bad record, or for accepting an early guilty plea – meaning that players with a good record or early plea could be ineligible despite avoiding suspension, or a player with a bad record could be eligible despite having been suspended.

Umpires cast their votes for each game independent of eligibility criteria of the players; i.e. umpires can cast votes for players who have already been suspended during that season if they perceive them to be amongst the best on the ground. Prior to 1991, votes could not be awarded to a player in a match in which he was reported, but this rule was eliminated in 1991 so that a player would not be disadvantaged if he would have gained votes in a match in which he was reported but later cleared by the tribunal.

On three occasions, an ineligible player has tallied the highest number of Brownlow votes:
 In 1996, Corey McKernan received the same number of votes as the joint-winners James Hird and Michael Voss. McKernan was suspended for one match during the season for kneeing. McKernan was named the AFL Players Association MVP in the same year, which is not subject to the same eligibility criteria.
 In 1997, Chris Grant polled one more vote than winner Robert Harvey. Grant was suspended for one match during the season for striking.
 In 2012, Jobe Watson was originally declared the winner by polling four more votes than runners up Trent Cotchin and Sam Mitchell, however in November 2016, he was retrospectively deemed ineligible for the award, due to his part in the Essendon Football Club supplements saga, and the title was given to Cotchin and Mitchell.

Criticism
The voting system has come under scrutiny because the medal is almost always won by midfield players, with relatively few key-position players ever winning. Some of the game's greatest players in these positions never even came close to winning the Brownlow despite having high reputations amongst their peers and coaches. This is primarily because players who are most valuable to their teams in key or defensive positions tend not to attract enough attention to feature amongst the top three players on the ground. It is also perceived that umpires may not be best suited to judging the quality of gameplay. Several prominent coaches, including Kevin Sheedy and Leigh Matthews, have publicly criticised the voting process.

The eligibility system has also come under criticism. The argument has been made that many offences worthy only of a one-match suspension are caused by negligent play, rather than intentionally "unfair" play, and hence that suspension is not a reasonable measure of fairness. The break from tradition under the newer demerit points-based tribunal system (i.e., a player being ineligible despite not having served a suspension) has also been criticised as confusing. Prominent players, including dual-winner Chris Judd, have indicated a desire to have the eligibility criterion removed from the award (effectively eliminating the fairest component altogether); but this view is not universally held, and 1958 winner Neil Roberts stated in 1988 that he would hand back his medal if the fairness criterion were removed.

Award ceremony

Over the years, the award ceremony has become increasingly elaborate, with footballers and their dates gradually becoming more fashion-conscious. This aspect of the night has become widely reported by gossip columns. The ceremony is currently held at Crown Casino and Entertainment Complex in Melbourne on the Monday five days prior to the AFL Grand Final. Only three times since the award's inception in 1924 has the count been held outside of Melbourne: when it was held in Sydney in 1999, and in 2020 and 2021 when the event was held virtually due to the COVID-19 pandemic preventing the event from being held in Melbourne. In years past, prospective Grand Final players have attended the ceremony in person, but in recent years non-Victorian Grand Final teams have declined to attend the ceremony due to the inconvenience of travel in such an important week; a live video link to Brownlow functions in their home city is done instead.

The event itself consists of the votes for each match being read out in succession by the CEO of the AFL, interspersed with a retrospective look at highlights from each round of the season and commentary from the broadcast network's usual football commentary team.

The integrity of the award is upheld by the tight security and secrecy surrounding the votes. Once the umpires make their decision, the votes are locked away and transported by armoured security vehicles. No one except the three umpires knows exactly who has been voted for, and as different umpires vote on different games, no one can be sure of who will win. Unlike most award ceremonies, the votes are not tallied or even opened until they are actually announced on the night, so the drama is maintained until late on the actual night, when the result sometimes comes down to the final round of votes.

From 1959 until 1974 radio stations including 3UZ, 3KZ and 3AW broadcast the vote counts. 1116 SEN now covers the count. Direct television telecasts began in 1970, when the venue was the Dallas Brooks Hall, and have occurred every year since.

Some bookmakers offer betting on the winner of the Brownlow Medal. A number of well-publicised "plunges" on supposed winners has led to increasingly elaborate security measures to ensure the Brownlow votes are kept secret until the vote count.

Since 1987, the theme used in the moments after the winning player has been announced is the end credits theme from The Untouchables.

Winners

Records

Most medals by player
 3 – Haydn Bunton Sr. (Fitzroy), Dick Reynolds (Essendon), Bob Skilton (South Melbourne), Ian Stewart (St Kilda/Richmond)

Most medals by club
 14 – Sydney/South Melbourne (1940, 1949, 1955, 1959, 1963, 1968, 1970, 1977, 1981, 1986, 1988, 1995, 2003, 2006)

Most votes in a season
 3–2–1 voting system: 36 – Dustin Martin (Richmond, 2017), Ollie Wines (Port Adelaide, 2021)
 All voting systems: 59 – Graham Teasdale (South Melbourne, 1977)

Most career votes
 261 – Gary Ablett Jr. (Geelong/Gold Coast)

Highest career average of votes per game
 1.04 – Haydn Bunton Sr. (Fitzroy)

Youngest winner
 Dick Reynolds (Essendon, 1934) – 19 years, 91 days

Oldest winner
 Barry Round (South Melbourne, 1981) – 31 years, 238 days

Winners with multiple clubs
 Ian Stewart (St Kilda, 1965 & 1966; Richmond, 1971)
 Peter Moore (Collingwood, 1979; Melbourne, 1984)
 Greg Williams (Sydney Swans, 1986; Carlton, 1994)
 Chris Judd (West Coast, 2004; Carlton, 2010)
 Gary Ablett Jr. (Geelong, 2009; Gold Coast, 2013)

Most votes by a club in a season (3–2–1 voting system)
 116 –  (2000)

Fewest votes by a club in a season (3–2–1 voting system)
 15 –  (2022)

See also

List of Brownlow Medal winners
AFL Women's best and fairest
Best and fairest
Dally M Medal
Norm Smith Medal

References

External links
 Allan Grant, "Saints in World Wars. Legends of the game – Peter Chitty" (St Kilda Football Club Web-site, 9 January 2006) – An account of the 1943 Changi Brownlow Medal won by Peter Chitty (includes a photograph of the medallion)
 Complete Brownlow Medal results

 
Awards established in 1924
Australian Football League awards
Australian rules football awards
1924 establishments in Australia
Sportsmanship trophies and awards